"Me Haces Falta" is a 2007 song by Jennifer Lopez

Me Haces Falta may also refer to:
"Me haces falta", song by Mexican group Yndio
"Me haces falta", song by Grupo Pegasso
"Me haces falta", song by La Mafia from Inconfundible
"Me haces falta", song by Grupo Bryndis from Memorias
"Me haces falta", song by Ana Gabriel from Soy como soy
"Me Haces Falta", the Spanish version of "I Need You" by Marc Anthony

See also
"Tú Me Haces Falta", song by Eddie Santiago 1989